Pithecopus  hypochondrialis, the northern orange-legged leaf frog or tiger-legged monkey frog, is a species of frog in the subfamily Phyllomedusinae found in South America.  Its natural habitats are subtropical or tropical dry forests, subtropical or tropical moist lowland forests, subtropical or tropical moist shrubland, subtropical or tropical seasonally wet or flooded lowland grassland, intermittent freshwater marshes, pastureland, plantations, rural gardens, urban areas, and heavily degraded former forests.

References

Phyllomedusinae
Amphibians of Argentina
Amphibians of Bolivia
Amphibians of Brazil
Amphibians of Colombia
Amphibians of Guyana
Amphibians of Paraguay
Amphibians of Suriname
Amphibians of Venezuela
Amphibians described in 1800
Taxonomy articles created by Polbot